Bowdon is a city in Carroll County, Georgia, United States. As of the 2020 census, the city had a population of 2,161.

History
The community was incorporated on January 1, 1859, and was named after Alabama congressman Franklin Welsh Bowdon.

A college was established in Bowdon in 1857.

Geography 

Bowdon is located near the Georgia-Alabama state line at 33° 32′ 22″ N, 85° 15′ 21″ W (33.539444 N, -85.255833 W). The main highways through the city are Georgia State Routes 100 and 166. GA-100 runs through the city from north to south, leading north  to Tallapoosa and south  to Ephesus. GA-166 runs through the city from west to east, leading east  to Carrollton, the county seat, and west  to its end at the Alabama-Georgia state line.

Climate
Bowdon has generally mild winters, with highs averaging in the low to mid 50s and lows around 32. Usually there are one or two days each winter when lows drop below 15. Snow is infrequent, averaging about 2" a winter. Some winters however, experience no snowfall. Ice is more common than snow. Rainfall is usually plentiful in the winter. Although severe weather is not very common, it does happen in the winter. The most recent severe weather event occurred on February 26, 2008, when an EF3 tornado hit an area about four miles north of Bowdon. The fall and spring months tend to bring the nicest weather, with numerous sunny days. Highs in the spring average in the 70s and lows average in the 40s and 50s. There is often severe weather in the spring, with occasionally a tornado. Fall tends to be the nicest season, with plentiful sunshine and highs in the 60s and 70s. Towards the end of fall, lows can drop below 30. Summer is often very humid and hot, although the heat is relieved by afternoon thunderstorms which occur almost daily. The summer of 2007 was one of the hottest on record with several days of highs above 100. Highs in the summer are generally around 90 with lows in the 60s. On May 11, 2008, Bowdon was hit by a series of tornadoes known as the "Mother's Day Storm" with a few reported injuries, but no deaths.

Demographics

2020 census

As of the 2020 United States Census, there were 2,161 people, 1,028 households, and 638 families residing in the city.

2000 census
As of the census of 2000, there were 1,959 people, 815 households, and 543 families residing in the city. The racial makeup of the city was 71.87% White, 25.17% African American, 0.31% Native American, 0.10% Asian, 1.23% from other races, and 1.33% from two or more races. Hispanic or Latino of any race were 2.40% of the population.

Bowdon was in 2000 tied with Rosemont, Illinois for being the place in the United States with the highest percentage of people reporting Bulgarian ancestry. They were both tied at 2.7%.

There were 815 households, out of which 32.3% had children under the age of 18 living with them, 43.1% were married couples living together, 20.6% had a female householder with no husband present, and 33.3% were non-families. 29.7% of all households were made up of individuals, and 13.5% had someone living alone who was 65 years of age or older. The average household size was 2.40 and the average family size was 2.97.

In the city, the population was spread out, with 26.1% under the age of 18, 10.6% from 18 to 24, 28.6% from 25 to 44, 20.6% from 45 to 64, and 14.2% who were 65 years of age or older. The median age was 35 years. For every 100 females, there were 87.5 males. For every 100 females age 18 and over, there were 78.8 males.

The median income for a household in the city was $27,875, and the median income for a family was $35,400. Males had a median income of $29,125 versus $19,643 for females. The per capita income for the city was $14,968. About 15.1% of families and 17.5% of the population were below the poverty line, including 22.5% of those under age 18 and 16.7% of those age 65 or over.

Media
Bowdon is the city of license for radio station WRDG.

Notable people

Bull Buchanan, current Rampage Pro Wrestling World Heavyweight Champion.
Nick Jones was twice signed by the Seattle Seahawks.
Michael 'Mike' Huey, a recording studio and world touring drummer.
Mike Dugan, Georgia State Senate Majority Leader.
CJ Brewer, #98 Defensive Tackle for the Buffalo Bills.

References

External links
 
 City of Bowdon Georgia Website Portal style website, Government, Business, Library, Recreation and more
 Site of Bowdon College historical marker
 Whatley Memorial Historic Park historical marker

Cities in Georgia (U.S. state)
Cities in Carroll County, Georgia
1859 establishments in Georgia (U.S. state)